George Henry Bernasconi (c. 1842–1916) was a Birmingham artist, the son of George Vincent Bernasconi, and of the same family as Francis Bernasconi.

Bernasconi exhibited at the Royal Academy twice, in 1861 and 1863. In the 1860s he moved to the Birmingham area and he is listed in the 1871 census as an artist in watercolours. There he contributed cartoons to the long-running Birmingham journal, the Town Crier, edited by his friend Wilmot Corfield. Later, he had a business in modelling and design. In 1885 he inherited almost £7,000 from his father.

His 1884 painting Merchant Shipping Bill Banner is in the People's History Museum, Manchester.

References

External links
George H. Bernasconi.

1841 births
1916 deaths
Painters from London
British people of Italian descent
20th-century British painters
British male painters
19th-century British male artists
20th-century British male artists